Weilenmann is a surname. Notable people with the surname include:

Gottfried Weilenmann (cyclist, born 1894) (born 1894), Swiss cyclist
Gottfried Weilenmann (cyclist, born 1920) (1920–2018), Swiss cyclist
Johann Jakob Weilenmann (1819–1896), Swiss mountaineer and Alpine writer
Leo Weilenmann (1922–1999), Swiss racing cyclist

See also
Weinmann
Wileman